Andrew Charles Weber (born 28 April 1960) was the Assistant Secretary of Defense for Nuclear, Chemical & Biological Defense Programs, whose areas of responsibility are US nuclear, chemical and biological defense programs. Appointed by President Obama, he was confirmed by the U.S. Senate on 18 May 2009 and served until 1 October 2014.

Early life
Born in New York City, Weber graduated from Scarsdale High School in 1978. He earned a Bachelor of Arts degree from Cornell University in 1982 and received a Master of Science in Foreign Service (MSFS) degree from Georgetown University in 1986.

Career
He played a key role in the Nunn–Lugar Cooperative Threat Reduction which removed weapons grade uranium from Kazakhstan and Georgia, and nuclear capable Mikoyan MiG-29 from Moldova. Weber also oversaw and developed the Defense Threat Reduction Agency and for his work has twice been awarded the Exceptional Civilian Service Medal. He served previously as a United States Foreign Service Officer. From 2002 to 2008, Weber taught a course on Force and Diplomacy at the Edmund A. Walsh School of Foreign Service in Georgetown University.

References

External links
 Interview with Andrew Weber on the 80,000 Hours podcast
 Speech by Andrew Weber detailing his time in Ukraine, including with Senator Obama

1960 births
Living people
People from New York City
Scarsdale High School alumni
Cornell University alumni
Walsh School of Foreign Service alumni
Walsh School of Foreign Service faculty
United States Assistant Secretaries of Defense
Obama administration personnel